Bijol Islands is a group of islets in the West African state of The Gambia.

Geography
The small uninhabited island group of the Bijol Islands is in the Atlantic Ocean. The five-islet group lies about two and a half to three and a half kilometers off the coast at Bald Cape north of the village of Tanji in the district of Kombo South. They form the westernmost territory of the Gambia. The total area of the Bijol Islands is 0.1 square kilometers.

References

 Ilona Hupe: Gambia. Kleines Urlaubsparadies in Westafrika. 2., aktualisierte Auflage. Hupe Ilona Verlag, München 1999, 
 Senegal & Gambia. Mit exakten Höhenlinien, Höhenschichten-Relief, GPS-tauglich, klassifiziertes Straßennetz, Gradnetz und Ortsindex. Reise Know-How Verlag Rump, Bielefeld 2004,  (Landkarte, 70 × 100 cm, 1:550.000)

Islands of the Gambia
Islands of the North Atlantic Ocean